Al-Mohammadi Mosque is a large mosque in the Habous quarter of Casablanca, Morocco. It was built circa 1935 and its construction was sponsored by Sultan Mohammed V, after whom it is named. 

Construction on the mosque started on 29 June 1934 and it was officially inaugurated two years later. It was designed by architects  and Edmond Brion, who were also implicated in the design of other buildings in the Habous quarter, including the nearby al-Yusufi Mosque. The building's design references traditional Moroccan Islamic architecture, with some details inspired by the architecture of the Qarawiyyin Mosque in Fes. The mosque underwent a major restoration in 2007.

References 

Religious buildings and structures in Casablanca
Mosques in Morocco
20th-century architecture in Morocco